The Quinault ( or ) are a group of Native American peoples from western Washington in the United States. They are a Southwestern Coast Salish people and are enrolled in the federally recognized Quinault Tribe of the Quinault Reservation.

The name "Quinault" is an anglicized version of  /ˈkʷinajɬ/, the traditional name of a village at the mouth of the Quinault River, today called Taholah. The river, village, and people were given the anglicized name Quinault in 1787 by the maritime fur trader Charles William Barkley. It is also possible that both names come from a French trapper from the Quinault family who visited the area.

Lands
It has a land area of 819.294 km² (316.331 sq mi) and reported a resident population of 1,370 persons as of the 2000 census. The Quinault people settled onto reservation lands after signing the Quinault Treaty with the former Washington Territory in 1856. About 60% of the reservation's population lives in the community of Taholah, on the Pacific coast at the mouth of the Quinault River.

Motorists are cautioned that it is not possible to traverse the entire reservation on Highway 109, in spite of what some online mapping services indicate. Construction of the highway north from Taholah to U.S. Highway 101 was halted in the late 1960s. There is only limited access (for private property owners and tribe members) along the northern coast of the reservation.

Currently, only enrolled members of the Quinault Indian Nation and their guests are allowed onto the beaches throughout the reservation without a pass. Guests can obtain access passes that allow them to use the beaches for the day issued.

Culture

Language

Related peoples
The mixture of members with ethnic ties to the modern Quinault tribe is made up of the Quinault, Hoh, Chehalis, Chinook, Cowlitz, Queets, and Quileute peoples. Linguistically, these groups belong to three language families: Chimakuan (Quileute, Hoh), Chinookan (Chinook groups), and Salishan (Chehalis, Cowlitz, Queets, and Quinault).

Basketry and weaving

The Quinault people have been noted basket makers and weavers. Baskets were made from locally available materials such as reeds and grasses, spruce, maple and red cedar, and in many styles suited to the task at hand. For instance, burden baskets made for gathering oysters and other shellfish had an open weave to allow for drainage, and were made from water resistant materials like cedar bark. Archaeology has revealed some of the ways basketmaking evolved over time, and the Ozette Indian Village Archeological Site, about  up the Pacific coast from the present-day Quinault reservation, has been an invaluable site that preserved objects subject to decay, such as baskets and blankets, in a mudslide.

Quinault basket artifacts are in many museums in the Northwest and around the world. The following were notable basket weavers of the Quinault prior to 1960.

Anna Black of Queets
Beatrice Black b. 1886 of Taholah
Irene Charley (Shale) b. 1908 of Taholah
Lena Hebalakp Charley (Bastian) b. 1877 of Taholah
Maggie Charley (Kalama) b. 1870 of Hoquiam
Mary Chips b. 1857 of Puyallup and La Push
Emily Cleveland b. 1929 of Queets
Lilly Cliff or Clip (Ford) b. 1865 of Neah Bay
Agnes Garfield (Hudson) b. 1894 of Taholah
Frances James (Bowechop) (1905-1972) of Neah Bay
Maggie James (Wain)(Kelly) b. 1886 of Queets
Anna Jette (Jackson) b. 1889 of Taholah
Hannah Mason (Bowechop)(Saux)(Payne) (1895-1971) of Taholah
Blanche Mowitch b. 1908 of Quinault
Laura Obi (Sam) b. 1864 of Queets
Charlotte Penn (Kalama) (1924-2010) of Queets
Hazel Purdy (Underwood) b. 1908 of Taholah
Blanche Lila Shale (McBride) b. 1925 of Taholah
Ella Shileba Hobucket  Wa-uc or Wa-bas-tub b. 1865 of La Push
Sarah or Sally Shileba/Shalber Legg (James)(Mason)(Freeman) b. 1865 of Lake Quinault and Taholah, wife of Chief Taholah
Joyce Simmons (Cheeka) b. 1901 of Neah Bay
Ida Strom (Law) b. 1898 of Taholah
Alice Taholah (Jackson) b. 1853 of Taholah, daughter of Chief Taholah
Maggie Ward (Harlow) Tso-ba-dook b. 1886 of Queets
Annie Williams (Waukenas) (1859-1951) of Taholah
Leta Williams (Shale) (Sailto) b. 1928 of Queets

There has been some attempt to preserve traditional basketmaking techniques on the Quinault reservation, though the style has been intermixed with that of other tribes.

Economy
Many tribes within the Pacific Northwest receive per capita payments from their tribes but the Quinault Indian Nation currently does not. The economy for Quinault Indian Nation is mainly derived from the Quinault Beach Resort and Casino, timber, and various fishing entities (Quinault Pride Seafood, etc.). Quinault Indian Nation is the largest employer within Grays Harbor County.

Communities
Amanda Park
Queets
Qui-nai-elt Village
Santiago
Taholah

References

Sources

Further reading

External links

Quinault Indian Nation, official website
University of Washington Libraries Digital Collections – The Pacific Northwest Olympic Peninsula Community Museum
 Inventory of the Quinault Indian Reservation Collection, 1939–1977, in the Forest History Society Library and Archives, Durham, NC
 Quinault artwork, collections of the National Museum of the American Indian

 
Native American tribes in Washington (state)
Coast Salish
Quinault